No Angel is a 1999 album by Dido.

No Angel(s) may also refer to:

Arts, entertainment, and media

Music
 No Angels, a German pop group
 "No Angel" (Birdy song), 2013
 "No Angel" (Beyoncé song), 2013
 "No Angel" (Charli XCX song), 2018
 "No Angel (It's All in Your Mind)", a 2003 song by No Angels
 "No Angel", a song by Simon Townshend from the album Animal Soup, 1999

Television
 No Angels (TV series)

See also
 Angel (disambiguation)
 I'm No Angel (disambiguation)